Byrneville is an unincorporated community in Jackson Township, Harrison County, Indiana.

History
Byrneville was platted in 1838 by Temple C. Byrn, who had settled there in 1809. A post office was established at Byrneville in 1851, and remained in operation until it was discontinued in 1906.

Geography

References

Unincorporated communities in Harrison County, Indiana
Unincorporated communities in Indiana
Louisville metropolitan area
Populated places established in 1838
1838 establishments in Indiana